In mathematical logic and type theory, the λ-cube (also written lambda cube) is a framework introduced by Henk Barendregt to investigate the different dimensions in which the calculus of constructions is a generalization of the simply typed λ-calculus. Each dimension of the cube corresponds to a new kind of dependency between terms and types. Here, "dependency" refers to the capacity of a term or type to bind a term or type. The respective dimensions of the λ-cube correspond to:

 x-axis: types that can bind terms, corresponding to dependent types.
 y-axis: terms that can bind types, corresponding to polymorphism.
 z-axis: types that can bind types, corresponding to (binding) type operators.

The different ways to combine these three dimensions yield the 8 vertices of the cube, each corresponding to a different kind of typed system. The λ-cube can be generalized into the concept of a pure type system.

Examples of Systems

(λ→) Simply typed lambda calculus 

The simplest system found in the λ-cube is the simply typed lambda calculus, also called λ→. In this system, the only way to construct an abstraction is by making a term depend on a term, with the typing rule

(λ2) System F 

For instance, the polymorphic identity fun x -> xof OCaml has type 'a -> 'ameaning it can take an argument of any type 'a and return an element of that type. This type corresponds in λ2 to the type .

(λω) System Fω 

In System F a construction is introduced to supply types that depend on other types. This is called a type constructor and provides a way to build "a function with a type as a value". This is a function that takes a type parameter  as an argument and returns the type of s of values of type . In concrete programming, this feature corresponds to the ability to define type constructors inside the language, rather than considering them as primitives. The previous type constructor roughly corresponds to the following definition of a tree with labeled leaves in OCaml:type 'a tree = | Leaf of 'a | Node of 'a tree * 'a tree

This type constructor can be applied to other types to obtain new types. E.g., to obtain type of trees of integers:type int_tree = int tree

System F is generally not used on its own, but is useful to isolate the independent feature of type constructors.

(λP) Lambda-P 
In the λP system, also named ΛΠ, and closely related to the LF Logical Framework, one has so called dependent types. These are types that are allowed to depend on terms. The crucial introduction rule of the system is

where  represents valid types. The new type constructor  corresponds via the Curry-Howard isomorphism to a universal quantifier, and the system λP as a whole corresponds to first-order logic with implication as only connective. An example of these dependent types in concrete programming is the type of vectors on a certain length: the length is a term, on which the type depends.

(Fω) System Fω 
System Fω combines both the  constructor of System F and the type constructors from System F. Thus System Fω provides both terms that depend on types and types that depend on types.

(λC) Calculus of constructions 
In the calculus of constructions, denoted as λC in the cube or as λPω, these four features cohabit, so that both types and terms can depend on types and terms. The clear border that exists in λ→ between terms and types is somewhat abolished, as all types except the universal  are themselves terms with a type.

Formal definition 

As for all systems based upon the simply typed lambda calculus, all systems in the cube are given in two steps: first, raw terms, together with a notion of β-reduction, and then typing rules that allow to type those terms.

There is also a set  of variables, represented by the letters . The raw terms of the eight systems of the cube are given by the following syntax:

The environment, as is usual in typed systems, are given by

The notion of β-reduction is common to all systems in the cube. It is written  and given by the rulesIts reflexive, transitive closure is written .

The following typing rules are also common to all systems in the cube:The difference between the systems is in the pairs of sorts  that are allowed in the following two typing rules:

The correspondence between the systems and the pairs  allowed in the rules is the following:

Each direction of the cube corresponds to one pair (excluding the pair  shared by all systems), and in turn each pair corresponds to one possibility of dependency between terms and types:

  allows terms to depend on terms.
  allows types to depend on terms.
  allows terms to depend on types.
  allows types to depend on types.

Comparison between the systems

λ→

A typical derivation that can be obtained isor with the arrow shortcutclosely resembling the identity (of type ) of the usual λ→.

The computing power is quite weak, it corresponds to the extended polynomials (polynomials together with a conditional operator).

λ2

In λ2, such terms can be obtained aswith . If one reads  as a universal quantification, via the Curry-Howard isomorphism, this can be seen as a proof of the principle of explosion. More precisely, the functions definable in λ2 are those provably total in second-order Peano arithmetic. In particular, all primitive recursive functions are definable.

λP

In λP, the ability to have types depending on terms means one can express logical predicates. For instance, the following is derivable:which corresponds, via  the Curry-Howard isomorphism, to a proof of .From the computational point of view, however, having dependent types does not enhance computational power, only the possibility to express more precise type properties.

The conversion rule is strongly needed when dealing with dependent types, because it allows to perform computation on the terms in the type.

λω

The derivationcan be obtained already in λ2, however the polymorphic  can only be defined if the rule  is also present.

From a computing point of view, λω is extremely strong, and has been considered as a basis for programming languages.

λC

The calculus of constructions has both the predicate expressiveness of λP and the computational power of λω, hence why λC is also called λPω, so it is very powerful, both on the logical side and on the computational side.

Relation to other systems 
The system Automath is similar to λ2 from a logical point of view. The ML-like languages, from a typing point of view, lie somewhere between λ→ and λ2, as they admit a restricted kind of polymorphic types, that is the types in prenex normal form. However, because they feature some recursion operators, their computing power is greater than that of λ2. The Coq system is based on an extension of λC with a linear hierarchy of universes, rather than only one untypable , and the ability to construct inductive types.

Pure type systems can be seen as a generalization of the cube, with an arbitrary set of sorts, axiom, product and abstraction rules. Conversely, the systems of the lambda cube can be expressed as pure type systems with two sorts , the only axiom , and a set of rules  such that .

Via the Curry-Howard isomorphism, there is a one-to-one correspondence between the systems in the lambda cube and logical systems, namely:

In the weak higher order logics, there are variables for higher order predicates, but no quantification on those can be done.

Common properties

All systems in the cube enjoy
 the subject reduction property: if  and  then ;
 the uniqueness of types: if  and  then .

All of these can be proven on generic pure type systems.

Any term well-typed in a system of the cube is strongly normalizing, although this property is not common to all pure type systems. No system in the cube is Turing complete.

Subtyping 
Subtyping however is not represented in the cube, even though systems like , known as higher-order bounded quantification, which combines subtyping and polymorphism are of practical interest, and can be further generalized to bounded type operators. Further extensions to  allow the definition of purely functional objects; these systems were generally developed after the lambda cube paper was published.

The idea of the cube is due to the mathematician Henk Barendregt (1991). The framework of pure type systems generalizes the lambda cube in the sense that all corners of the cube, as well as many other systems can be represented as instances of this general framework. This framework predates the lambda cube by a couple of years. In his 1991 paper, Barendregt also defines the corners of the cube in this framework.

See also 

 In his Habilitation à diriger les recherches, Olivier Ridoux gives a cut-out template of the lambda cube and also a dual representation of the cube as an octahedron, where the 8 vertices are replaced by faces, as well as a dual representation as a dodecahedron, where the 12 edges are replaced by faces.
 Homotopy type theory

Notes

Further reading

External links 

 Barendregt's Lambda Cube in the context of pure type systems by Roger Bishop Jones

Lambda calculus
Type theory